Han Tong (908–3 February 960), courtesy name Zhongda, was a Chinese military officer during the Five Dynasties period who became a top general during the Later Zhou dynasty. In the early years of the Later Zhou, he strengthened the northern defense against the hostile Northern Han and Liao, and participated in the 955 invasion of the Later Shu. From 955, he remained mainly in the capital, Kaifeng, and wielded his influence during the reign of the child emperor Guo Zongxun. In 960, when general and former subordinate Zhao Kuangyin usurped the Later Zhou throne, Han Tong and his entire family were massacred by Zhao's officer Wang Yansheng.

References

908 births
960 deaths